|}

The Tied Cottage Chase was a Grade 2 National Hunt steeplechase that takes place in Ireland. It was run at Punchestown Racecourse in late January or early February each year, over a distance of 2 miles with 11 fences. The race was named after Tied Cottage, a National Hunt horse who won the event in 1980.  The race was founded in 1999 and was recently sponsored by Boylesports.

The race was last run in February 2017, as it was replaced by the Dublin Chase at the new Leopardstown Dublin Festival in 2018.

Records
Most successful horse (2 wins):
 Moscow Flyer – 2003, 2005
 Sizing Europe - 2012, 2013

Leading jockey (4 wins):
 Barry Geraghty – Moscow Flyer (2003, 2005), Native Scout (2004), Big Zeb (2010)
 Ruby Walsh - Nickname (2007), Arvika Ligeonniere (2014), Felix Yonger (2016), Douvan (2017)

Leading trainer (4 wins):

 Willie Mullins - Golden Silver (2011), Arvika Ligeonniere (2014), Felix Yonger (2016), Douvan (2017)

Winners

See also
 List of Irish National Hunt races

References

Racing Post:

National Hunt races in Ireland
National Hunt chases
Punchestown Racecourse